Leigha Kayleen Hancock Moriarty  is an American stunt actress  best known for her role as the District 7 female tribute in The Hunger Games.

Career

Hancock stands at four feet eleven inches and has a background in gymnastics.  Between 2009 and 2010 she had also appeared in Make It or Break It. Hancock co-starred in the 2013 film Admission. She has other experience as a gymnast, graduating from North Carolina State University. She married her husband, Bryan, on September 26, 2012.

Filmography

References

External links
 
 

1986 births
Living people
American stunt performers
American film actresses
North Carolina State University alumni
21st-century American women